Naanal is a 2008-2009 Indian-Tamil-language soap opera starring Sonia Agarwal, Neebha and Shreekumar. It replaced Manjal Magimai and it broadcast on Kalaignar TV from 15 December 2008 to 2009 on Monday through Thursday at 19:30 (IST). It will star Sonia Agarwal, who makes her debut on the small screen.

The show is Written and produced by Khusbhu Sundar for Avni Telemedia. From 22 August 2016 to March 2017 the show was relaunched in Kalaignar TV aired Monday to Friday at 21:30 (IST).

Plot
Radhika was widowed at a young age. She comes out of her grievances and starts a new life when fate strikes again. She learns that her husband Rajesh is still alive after five years and is married to another woman 'Kadhambari'. Naanal is a type of tall growing grass on the banks of rivers which twists, turns and bends in severe storm, but never breaks. As the title implies, she bends and bows when the storm strikes and survives the hardships without breaking down. Kadhambari takes all sorts of efforts to prevent the union of Rajesh and Radhika. Amidst all the turmoil, Radhika learns that Kadhambari's grandmother who was responsible for the ill fate of her family. Radhika's strength and virtue are the backbone of the story.

Cast
 Sonia Agarwal as Radhika (Rajesh's first wife)
 Neebha as Kadhambari (Rajesh second wife)
 Shreekumar as Rajesh (Radhika and Kandambari's Husband)
 Revathy Shankaran
 ARS
 Vichu
 Rajesh
 Joker Thulasi
 Bhanumathy

International broadcast
The Series was released on 15 December 2008 on Kalaignar TV. The Show was also broadcast internationally on Channel's international distribution. It aired in Sri Lanka, Singapore, Malaysia, South East Asia, Middle East, Oceania, South Africa and Sub Saharan Africa on Kalaignar TV and also aired in United States, Canada, Europe on Kalaignar Ayngaran TV.

References

External links
 

Kalaignar TV television series
2000s Tamil-language television series
2008 Tamil-language television series debuts
2009 Tamil-language television series endings
Tamil-language television shows